Balama may refer to:

Balama District, a district of Cabo Delgado Province in northern Mozambique
Balama, a town in Balama District of Cabo Delgado Province in northern Mozambique
Balama mine, one of the largest graphite mines in Mozambique and in the world located in the northern part of the country in Cabo Delgado Province